

Events

Pre-1600
477 BC – Battle of the Cremera as part of the Roman–Etruscan Wars.  Veii ambushes and defeats the Roman army.
387 BC – Roman-Gaulish Wars: Battle of the Allia: A Roman army is defeated by raiding Gauls, leading to the subsequent sacking of Rome.
 362 – Roman–Persian Wars: Emperor Julian arrives at Antioch with a Roman expeditionary force (60,000 men) and stays there for nine months to launch a campaign against the Persian Empire.
 452 – Sack of Aquileia: After an earlier defeat on the Catalaunian Plains, Attila lays siege to the metropolis of Aquileia and eventually destroys it.
 645 – Chinese forces under general Li Shiji besiege the strategic fortress city of Anshi (Liaoning) during the Goguryeo–Tang War.
1195 – Battle of Alarcos: Almohad forces defeat the Castilian army of Alfonso VIII and force its retreat to Toledo.
1290 – King Edward I of England issues the Edict of Expulsion, banishing all Jews (numbering about 16,000) from England; this was Tisha B'Av on the Hebrew calendar, a day that commemorates many Jewish calamities.
1334 – The bishop of Florence blesses the first foundation stone for the new campanile (bell tower) of the Florence Cathedral, designed by the artist Giotto di Bondone.
1389 – France and England agree to the Truce of Leulinghem, inaugurating a 13-year peace, the longest period of sustained peace during the Hundred Years' War.
1391 – Tokhtamysh–Timur war: Battle of the Kondurcha River: Timur defeats Tokhtamysh of the Golden Horde in present-day southeast Russia.
1507 – In Brussels, Prince Charles I is crowned Duke of Burgundy and Count of Flanders, a year after inheriting the title.
1555 – The College of Arms is reincorporated by Royal charter signed by Queen Mary I of England and King Philip II of Spain.

1601–1900
1806 – A gunpowder magazine explosion in Birgu, Malta, kills around 200 people.
1812 – The Treaties of Orebro end both the Anglo-Russian and Anglo-Swedish Wars.
1841 – Coronation of Emperor Pedro II of Brazil.
1857 – Louis Faidherbe, French governor of Senegal, arrives to relieve French forces at Kayes, effectively ending El Hajj Umar Tall's war against the French.
1862 – First ascent of Dent Blanche, one of the highest summits in the Alps.
1863 – American Civil War: Second Battle of Fort Wagner: One of the first formal African American military units, the 54th Massachusetts Volunteer Infantry, supported by several white regiments, attempts an unsuccessful assault on Confederate-held Battery Wagner.
1870 – The First Vatican Council decrees the dogma of papal infallibility.
1872 – The Ballot Act 1872 in the United Kingdom introduced the requirement that parliamentary and local government elections be held by secret ballot.

1901–present
1914 – The U.S. Congress forms the Aviation Section, U.S. Signal Corps, giving official status to aircraft within the U.S. Army for the first time.
1925 – Adolf Hitler publishes Mein Kampf.
1936 – On the Spanish mainland, a faction of the army supported by fascists, rises up against the Second Spanish Republic in a coup d'état starting the 3-year-long Civil War, resulting in the longest dictatorship in modern European history.
1942 – World War II: During the Beisfjord massacre in Norway, 15 Norwegian paramilitary guards help members of the SS to kill 288 political prisoners from Yugoslavia.  
  1942   – The Germans test fly the Messerschmitt Me 262 using its jet engines for the first time.
1944 – World War II: Hideki Tōjō resigns as Prime Minister of Japan because of numerous setbacks in the war effort.
1966 – Human spaceflight: Gemini 10 is launched from Cape Kennedy on a 70-hour mission that includes docking with an orbiting Agena target vehicle.
  1966   – A racially charged incident in a bar sparks the six-day Hough riots in Cleveland, Ohio; 1,700 Ohio National Guard troops intervene to restore order.
1968 – Intel is founded in Mountain View, California.
1976 – Nadia Comăneci becomes the first person in Olympic Games history to score a perfect 10 in gymnastics at the 1976 Summer Olympics.
1982 – Two hundred sixty-eight Guatemalan campesinos ("peasants" or "country people") are slain in the Plan de Sánchez massacre.
1981 – A Canadair CL-44 and Sukhoi Su-15 collide in mid-air near Yerevan, Armenia, killing four.
1984 – McDonald's massacre in San Ysidro, California: In a fast-food restaurant, James Oliver Huberty opens fire, killing 21 people and injuring 19 others before being shot dead by police.
1992 – A picture of Les Horribles Cernettes was taken, which became the first ever photo posted to the World Wide Web.
1994 – The bombing of the Asociación Mutual Israelita Argentina (Argentine Jewish Community Center) in Buenos Aires kills 85 people (mostly Jewish) and injures 300.
  1994   – Rwandan genocide: The Rwandan Patriotic Front takes control of Gisenyi and north western Rwanda, forcing the interim government into Zaire and ending the genocide.
1995 – On the Caribbean island of Montserrat, the Soufrière Hills volcano erupts. Over the course of several years, it devastates the island, destroying the capital, forcing most of the population to flee.
1996 – Storms provoke severe flooding on the Saguenay River, beginning one of Quebec's costliest natural disasters ever.
  1996   – Battle of Mullaitivu: The Liberation Tigers of Tamil Eelam capture the Sri Lanka Army's base, killing over 1,200 soldiers.
2002 – A Consolidated PB4Y-2 Privateer crashes near Estes Park, Colorado, killing both crew members.
2012 – At least seven people are killed and 32 others are injured after a bomb explodes on an Israeli tour bus at Burgas Airport, Bulgaria. 
2013 – The Government of Detroit, with up to $20 billion in debt, files for the largest municipal bankruptcy in U.S. history.
2014 – The Islamic State of Iraq and the Levant requires Christians to either accept dhimmi status, emigrate from ISIL lands, or be killed.
2019 – A man sets fire to an anime studio in Fushimi-ku, Kyoto, Japan, killing at least 35 people and injuring dozens of others.

Births

Pre-1600
1013 – Hermann of Reichenau, German composer, mathematician, and astronomer (b. 1013)
1501 – Isabella of Austria, queen of Denmark (d. 1526)
1504 – Heinrich Bullinger, Swiss pastor and reformer (d. 1575)
1534 – Zacharius Ursinus, German theologian (d. 1583)
1552 – Rudolf II, Holy Roman Emperor (d. 1612)

1601–1900
1634 – Johannes Camphuys, Dutch politician, Governor-general of the Dutch East Indies (d. 1695)
1659 – Hyacinthe Rigaud, French painter (d. 1743)
1670 – Giovanni Bononcini, Italian cellist and composer (d. 1747)
1702 – Maria Clementina Sobieska, Polish noble (d. 1735)
1718 – Saverio Bettinelli, Italian poet, playwright, and critic (d. 1808)
1720 – Gilbert White, English ornithologist and ecologist (d. 1793)
1724 – Maria Antonia of Bavaria, Electress of Saxony (d. 1780)
1750 – Frederick Adolf, duke of Östergötland (d. 1803)
1796 – Immanuel Hermann Fichte, German philosopher and academic (d. 1879)
1811 – William Makepeace Thackeray, English author and poet (d. 1863)
1818 – Louis Gerhard De Geer, Swedish lawyer and politician, 1st Prime Minister of Sweden (d. 1896)
1821 – Pauline Viardot, French soprano and composer (d. 1910)
1837 – Vasil Levski, Bulgarian priest and activist (d. 1873)
1842 – William D. Coleman, 13th President of Liberia (d. 1908)
1843 – Virgil Earp, American marshal (d. 1905)
1845 – Tristan Corbière, French poet (d. 1875)
1848 – W. G. Grace, English cricketer and physician (d. 1915)
1853 – Hendrik Lorentz, Dutch physicist and academic, Nobel Prize laureate (d. 1928)
1861 – Kadambini Ganguly, Indian physician, one of the first Indian women to obtain a degree (d. 1923) 
1864 – Philip Snowden, 1st Viscount Snowden, English politician, Chancellor of the Exchequer (d. 1937)
1867 – Margaret Brown, American philanthropist and activist (d. 1932)
1871 – Giacomo Balla, Italian painter (d.1958)
  1871   – Sada Yacco, Japanese actress and dancer (d. 1946)
1872 – Julius Fučík, Czech composer and conductor of military bands (d. 1916)
1881 – Larry McLean, Canadian-American baseball player (d. 1921)
1884 – Alberto di Jorio, Italian cardinal (d. 1979)
1886 – Simon Bolivar Buckner Jr., American general (d. 1945)
1887 – Vidkun Quisling, Norwegian military officer and politician, Minister President of Norway (d. 1945)
1889 – Kōichi Kido, Japanese politician, 13th Lord Keeper of the Privy Seal of Japan (d. 1977)
1890 – Frank Forde, Australian educator and politician, 15th Prime Minister of Australia (d. 1983)
1892 – Arthur Friedenreich, Brazilian footballer (d. 1969)
1893 – David Ogilvy, 12th Earl of Airlie, Scottish peer, soldier and courtier (d. 1968)
1895 – Olga Spessivtseva, Russian-American ballerina (d. 1991)
  1895   – Machine Gun Kelly, American gangster (d. 1954)
1897 – Ernest Eldridge, English race car driver and engineer (d. 1935)
1898 – John Stuart, Scottish-English actor (d. 1979)
1899 – Ernst Scheller, German soldier and politician, 8th Mayor of Marburg (d. 1942)
1900 – Nathalie Sarraute, French lawyer and author (d. 1999)

1901–present
1902 – Jessamyn West, American author (d. 1984)
  1902   – Chill Wills, American actor (d. 1978)
1906 – S. I. Hayakawa, Canadian-American academic and politician (d. 1992)
  1906   – Clifford Odets, American director, playwright, and screenwriter (d. 1963)
1908 – Peace Pilgrim, American mystic and activist (d. 1981)
  1908   – Lupe Vélez, Mexican-American actress and dancer (d. 1944)
  1908   – Beatrice Aitchison, American mathematician, statistician, and transportation economist (d. 1997)
1909 – Bishnu Dey, Indian poet, critic, and academic (d. 1982)
  1909   – Andrei Gromyko, Belarusian-Russian economist and politician, Soviet Minister of Foreign Affairs (d. 1989)
  1909   – Mohammed Daoud Khan, Afghan commander and politician, 1st President of Afghanistan (d. 1978)
  1909   – Harriet Nelson, American singer and actress (d. 1994)
1910 – Diptendu Pramanick, Indian businessman (d. 1989)
  1910   – Mamadou Dia, Senegalese politician; 1st Prime Minister of Senegal (d. 2009)
1911 – Hume Cronyn, Canadian-American actor, producer, and screenwriter (d. 2003)
1913 – Red Skelton, American actor and comedian (d. 1997)
1914 – Gino Bartali, Italian cyclist (d. 2000)
  1914   – Oscar Heisserer, French footballer (d. 2004)
1915 – Carequinha, Brazilian clown and actor (d. 2006)
  1915   – Louis Le Bailly, British Royal Navy officer (d. 2010) 
1916 – Charles Kittel, American physicist  (d. 2019)
1917 – Henri Salvador, French singer and guitarist (d. 2008)
  1917   – Paul Streeten, Austrian-born British economics professor (d. 2019)
1918 – Nelson Mandela, South African lawyer and politician, 1st President of South Africa, Nobel Prize laureate (d. 2013)
1919 – Lilia Dale, Italian actress
1920 – Eric Brandon, English race car driver and businessman (d. 1982)
1921 – Peter Austin, English brewer, founded Ringwood Brewery (d. 2014)
  1921   – Aaron Beck, American psychiatrist and academic (d. 2021)
  1921   – John Glenn, American colonel, astronaut, and politician (d. 2016)
  1921   – Richard Leacock, English-French director and producer (d. 2011)
  1921   – Heinz Bennent, German actor (d. 2011)
1922 – Thomas Kuhn, American  physicist, historian, and philosopher (d. 1996)
1923 – Jerome H. Lemelson, American engineer and businessman (d. 1997)
  1923   – Michael Medwin, English actor (d. 2020)
1924 – Inge Sørensen, Danish swimmer (d. 2011)
  1924   – Tullio Altamura, Italian actor
1925 – Shirley Strickland, Australian runner and hurdler (d. 2004)
  1925   – Friedrich Zimmermann, German lawyer and politician, German Federal Minister of the Interior (d. 2012)
  1925   – Raymond Jones, Australian Modernist architect (d. 2022)
  1925   – Windy McCall, American baseball relief pitcher (d. 2015)
1926 – Margaret Laurence, Canadian author and academic (d. 1987)
  1926   – Nita Bieber, American actress (d. 2019)
  1926   – Bernard Pons, French politician and medical doctor (d. 2022)
  1926   – Maunu Kurkvaara, Finnish film director and screenwriter
1927 – Mehdi Hassan, Pakistani ghazal singer and playback singer (d. 2012)
  1927   – Kurt Masur, German conductor and educator (d. 2015)
  1927   – Antonio García-Trevijano, Spanish republican, political activist, and author (d. 2018)
  1927   – Keith MacDonald, Canadian politician (d. 2021)
  1927   – Anthony Mirra, American gangster, member of the Bonanno Crime Family (d. 1982)
1928 – Andrea Gallo, Italian priest and author (d. 2013)
  1928   – Baddiewinkle, American internet personality
1929 – Dick Button, American former figure skater and actor
  1929   – Screamin' Jay Hawkins, American R&B singer-songwriter, musician, and actor (d. 2000) 
1932 – Robert Ellis Miller, American director and screenwriter (d. 2017)
1933 – Jean Yanne, French actor, director, producer, and screenwriter (d. 2003)
  1933   – Yevgeny Yevtushenko, Russian poet and playwright (d. 2017)
1934 – Edward Bond, English director, playwright, and screenwriter
  1934   – Darlene Conley, American actress (d. 2007)
1935 – Tenley Albright, American former figure skater and physician
  1935   – Jayendra Saraswathi, Indian guru, 69th Shankaracharya (d. 2018)
1937 – Roald Hoffmann, Polish chemist and academic, Nobel Prize laureate
  1937   – Hunter S. Thompson, American journalist and author (d. 2005)
1938 – John Connelly, English footballer (d. 2012)
  1938   – Ian Stewart, Scottish keyboard player and manager (d. 1985)
  1938   – Paul Verhoeven, Dutch director, producer, and screenwriter
1939 – Brian Auger, English rock and jazz keyboard player 
  1939   – Dion DiMucci, American singer-songwriter and guitarist 
  1939   – Jerry Moore, American football player and coach
1940 – James Brolin, American actor
1941 – Frank Farian, German songwriter and producer
  1941   – Lonnie Mack, American singer-songwriter and guitarist (d. 2016)
  1941   – Martha Reeves, American singer and politician 
1942 – Giacinto Facchetti, Italian footballer (d. 2006)
  1942   – Adolf Ogi, Swiss politician, 84th President of the Swiss Confederation
1943 – Joseph J. Ellis, American historian and author
1944 – David Hemery, English hurdler and author
1945 – Pat Doherty, Irish Republican politician
1946 – Kalpana Mohan, Indian actress (d. 2012)
1947 – Steve Forbes, American publisher and politician
1948 – Carlos Colón Sr., Puerto Rican-American wrestler and promoter
  1948   – Jeanne Córdova, American journalist and activist (d. 2016)
  1948   – Hartmut Michel, German biochemist and academic, Nobel Prize laureate
1949 – Dennis Lillee, Australian cricketer and coach
1950 – Richard Branson, English businessman, founded Virgin Group
  1950   – Jack Dongarra, American computer scientist and academic
  1950   – Kostas Eleftherakis, Greek footballer
  1950   – Glenn Hughes, American disco singer and actor (d. 2001)
  1950   – Jack Layton, Canadian political scientist, academic, and politician (d. 2011)
  1950   – Mark Udall, American educator and politician
1951 – Elio Di Rupo, Belgian chemist, academic, and politician, 68th Prime Minister of Belgium
  1951   – Margo Martindale, American actress
1954 – Ricky Skaggs, American singer-songwriter, mandolin player, and producer 
1955 – Bernd Fasching, Austrian painter and sculptor
1957 – Nick Faldo, English golfer and sportscaster
  1957   – Keith Levene, English guitarist, songwriter, and producer (d. 2022) 
1960 – Simon Heffer, English journalist and author
1961 – Elizabeth McGovern, American actress
  1961   – Alan Pardew, English footballer and manager
  1961   – Pasi Rautiainen, Finnish footballer, coach, and manager
1962 – Shaun Micallef, Australian comedian, producer, and screenwriter
1963 – Marc Girardelli, Austrian-Luxembourgian skier
  1963   – Martín Torrijos, Panamanian economist and politician, 35th President of Panama
1964 – Wendy Williams, American talk show host
1965 – Vesselina Kasarova, Bulgarian soprano
1966 – Dan O'Brien, American decathlete and coach
1967 – Vin Diesel, American actor, director, producer, and screenwriter
1968 – Grant Bowler, New Zealand-Australian actor
  1968   – Scott Gourley, Australian rugby player
1969 – Elizabeth Gilbert, American author
  1969   – The Great Sasuke, Japanese wrestler and politician
1971 – Penny Hardaway, American basketball player and coach
  1971   – Sukhwinder Singh, Indian singer-songwriter and actor
1974 – Alan Morrison, British poet
1975 – Torii Hunter, American baseball player
  1975   – Daron Malakian, American singer-songwriter, guitarist, and producer
  1975   – M.I.A., English rapper and producer
1976 – Elsa Pataky, Spanish actress
  1976   – Go Soo-hee, South Korean actress
1977 – Alexander Morozevich, Russian chess player and author
1978 – Adabel Guerrero, Argentinian actress, singer, and dancer
  1978   – Shane Horgan, Irish rugby player and sportscaster
  1978   – Crystal Mangum, American murderer responsible for making false rape allegations in the Duke lacrosse case
  1978   – Joo Sang-wook, South Korean actor
  1978   – Ben Sheets, American baseball player and coach
  1978   – Mélissa Theuriau, French journalist
1979 – Deion Branch, American football player
  1979   – Joey Mercury, American wrestler and producer
1980 – Kristen Bell, American actress
  1980   – David Blu (born David Bluthenthal), American–Israeli basketball player
1981 – Dennis Seidenberg, German ice hockey player
1982 – Ryan Cabrera, American singer-songwriter and guitarist
  1982   – Priyanka Chopra, Indian actress, singer, and film producer
  1982   – Carlo Costly, Honduran footballer 
  1983   – Mishaal Al-Saeed, Suadi Arabian footballer
1983   – Carlos Diogo, Uruguayan footballer
  1983   – Aaron Gillespie, American singer-songwriter and drummer 
  1983   – Mikk Pahapill, Estonian decathlete
  1983   – Jan Schlaudraff, German footballer
1985 – Chace Crawford, American actor
  1985   – Panagiotis Lagos, Greek footballer
  1985   – James Norton, English actor
1986 – Natalia Mikhailova, Russian ice dancer
1987 – Tontowi Ahmad, Indonesian badminton player
1988 – Änis Ben-Hatira, German-Tunisian footballer
  1988   – César Villaluz, Mexican footballer
1989 – Jamie Benn, Canadian ice hockey player
  1989   – Sebastian Mielitz, German footballer
  1989   – Yohan Mollo, French footballer
1993 – Lee Tae-min, South Korean singer and actor
  1993   – Michael Lichaa, Australian rugby league player
1994 – Nilo Soares, East Timorese footballer
1996 – Smriti Mandhana, Indian cricketer
1996 – Shudufhadzo Musida, Miss South Africa 2020
1997 – Noah Lyles, American sprinter
2001 – Agustina Roth, Argentine BMX rider

Deaths

Pre-1600
707 – Emperor Monmu of Japan (b. 683)
 715 – Muhammad bin Qasim, Umayyad general (b. 695)
 912 – Zhu Wen, Chinese emperor (b. 852)
 924 – Abu'l-Hasan Ali ibn al-Furat, Abbasid vizier (b. 855)
 928 – Stephen II, patriarch of Constantinople
 984 – Dietrich I, bishop of Metz
1100 – Godfrey of Bouillon, Frankish knight (b. 1016)
1185 – Stefan, first Archbishop of Uppsala (b. before 1143)
1194 – Guy of Lusignan, king consort of Jerusalem (b. c. 1150)
1232 – John de Braose, Marcher Lord of Bramber and Gower
1270 – Boniface of Savoy, Archbishop of Canterbury 
1300 – Gerard Segarelli, Italian religious leader, founded the Apostolic Brethren (b. 1240)
1450 – Francis I, Duke of Brittany (b. 1414)
1488 – Alvise Cadamosto, Italian explorer (b. 1432)
1566 – Bartolomé de las Casas, Spanish bishop and historian (b. c.1484)
1591 – Jacobus Gallus, Slovenian composer (b. 1550)

1601–1900
1608 – Joachim Frederick, Elector of Brandenburg (b. 1546)
1610 – Caravaggio, Italian painter (b. 1571)
1639 – Bernard of Saxe-Weimar, German general (b. 1604)
1650 – Robert Levinz, English Royalist, hanged in London by Parliamentary forces as a spy (b. 1615)
1695 – Johannes Camphuys, Dutch politician, Governor-general of the Dutch East Indies (b. 1634)
1698 – Johann Heinrich Heidegger, Swiss theologian and author (b. 1633)
1721 – Jean-Antoine Watteau, French painter (b. 1684)
1730 – François de Neufville, duc de Villeroy, French general (b. 1644)
1756 – Pieter Langendijk, Dutch poet and playwright (b. 1683)
1792 – John Paul Jones, Scottish-American admiral and diplomat (b. 1747)
1817 – Jane Austen, English novelist  (b. 1775)
1837 – Vincenzo Borg, Maltese merchant and rebel leader (b. 1777)
1863 – Robert Gould Shaw, American colonel (b. 1837)
1872 – Benito Juárez, Mexican lawyer and politician, 26th President of Mexico (b. 1806)
1884 – Ferdinand von Hochstetter, Austrian geologist and academic (b. 1829)
1890 – Lydia Becker, English journalist, author, and activist, co-founded the Women's Suffrage Journal (b. 1827)
1892 – Thomas Cook, English travel agent, founded the Thomas Cook Group (b. 1808)
1899 – Horatio Alger, American novelist and journalist (b. 1832)

1901–present
1916 – Benjamin C. Truman, American journalist and author (b. 1835)
1925 – Louis-Nazaire Bégin, Canadian cardinal (b. 1840)
1932 – Jean Jules Jusserand, French author and diplomat, French Ambassador to the United States (b. 1855)
1937 – Julian Bell, English poet and academic (b. 1908)
1938 – Marie of Romania (b. 1875)
1944 – Thomas Sturge Moore, English author, poet, and playwright (b. 1870)
1947 – Evald Tipner, Estonian footballer and ice hockey player (b. 1906)
1948 – Herman Gummerus, Finnish historian, academic, and politician (b. 1877)
1949 – Vítězslav Novák, Czech composer and educator (b. 1870)
  1949   – Francisco Javier Arana, Guatemalan Army colonel and briefly Guatemalan head of state (b.1905)
1950 – Carl Clinton Van Doren, American critic and biographer (b. 1885)
1952 – Paul Saintenoy, Belgian architect and historian (b. 1862)
1954 – Machine Gun Kelly, American gangster (b. 1895)
1966 – Bobby Fuller, American singer-songwriter and guitarist (b. 1942)
1968 – Corneille Heymans, Belgian physiologist and academic, Nobel Prize laureate (b. 1892)
1969 – Mary Jo Kopechne, American educator and secretary (b. 1940)
1973 – Jack Hawkins, English actor (b. 1910)
1975 – Vaughn Bodē, American illustrator (b. 1941)
1981 – Sonja Branting-Westerståhl, Swedish lawyer (b. 1890)
1982 – Roman Jakobson, Russian–American linguist and theorist (b. 1896)
1984 – Lally Bowers, English actress (b. 1914)
  1984   – Grigori Kromanov, Estonian director and screenwriter (b. 1926)
1987 – Gilberto Freyre, Brazilian sociologist, anthropologist, historian, writer, painter, journalist and congressman (b. 1907)
1988 – Nico, German singer-songwriter, keyboard player, and actress (b. 1938)
  1988   – Joly Braga Santos, Portuguese composer and conductor (b. 1924)
1989 – Donnie Moore, American baseball player (b. 1954)
  1989   – Rebecca Schaeffer, American model and actress (b. 1967)
1990 – Karl Menninger, American psychiatrist and author (b. 1896)
  1990   – Yun Posun, South Korean politician, 2nd President of South Korea (b. 1897)
2001 – Mimi Fariña, American singer-songwriter and guitarist (b. 1945)
2002 – Metin Toker, Turkish journalist and author (b. 1924)
2004 – André Castelot, Belgian-French historian and author (b. 1911)
  2004   – Émile Peynaud, French wine maker (b. 1912)
2005 – Amy Gillett, Australian cyclist and rower (b. 1976)
  2005   – William Westmoreland, American general (b. 1914)
2006 – Henry Hewes, American theater writer (b. 1917)
2007 – Jerry Hadley, American tenor (b. 1952)
  2007   – Kenji Miyamoto, Japanese politician (b. 1908)
2009 – Henry Allingham, English soldier (b. 1896)
  2009   – Jill Balcon, English actress (b. 1925)
2012 – Yosef Shalom Eliashiv, Lithuanian-Israeli rabbi and author (b. 1910)
  2012   – Jean François-Poncet, French politician and diplomat, French Minister of Foreign Affairs (b. 1928)
  2012   – Dawoud Rajiha, Syrian general and politician, Syrian Minister of Defense (b. 1947)
  2012   – Assef Shawkat, Syrian general and politician (b. 1950)
  2012   – Hasan Turkmani, Syrian general and politician, Syrian Minister of Defense (b. 1935)
  2012   – Rajesh Khanna, Indian actor (b. 1942)
2013 – Vaali, Indian poet, songwriter, and actor (b. 1931)
  2013   – Olivier Ameisen,  French-American cardiologist and academic (b. 1953)
2014 – Andreas Biermann, German footballer (b. 1980)
  2014   – João Ubaldo Ribeiro, Brazilian journalist, author, and academic (b. 1941)
  2014   – Dietmar Schönherr, Austrian-Spanish actor, director, and screenwriter (b. 1926)
2015 – Alex Rocco, American actor (b. 1936)
2018 – Jonathan Gold, American food critic (b. 1960)
  2018   – Adrian Cronauer, American radio personality (b. 1938)
2021 – Tom O'Connor, English comedian (b. 1939)

Holidays and observances
Christian feast day:
Arnulf of Metz
Bruno of Segni
Camillus de Lellis (optional memorial, United States only)
Eadburh (or Edburga) of Bicester
Elizabeth Ferard (Church of England)
Frederick of Utrecht
Maternus of Milan
Pambo
Philastrius
Symphorosa
Theodosia of Constantinople
July 18 (Eastern Orthodox liturgics)
Constitution Day (Uruguay)
Nelson Mandela International Day

References

External links

 
 
 

Days of the year
July